The following is a list of men who played for the American Football League (AFL, 1960–1969).

Players

A

B

C

D
Elbert Dubenion

E

F

G

H

I

J

K

L

M

N

O

P

Q

R

S

T

U

V

W

Y

Z

Notes

Player notes
1,398 people played in the American Football League at one time or another. Out of those 1,398, this is how many played for X number of years

601 players played in one AFL season.
282 players played in two AFL seasons.
142 players played in three AFL seasons.
92 players played in four AFL seasons.
76 players played in five AFL seasons.
79 players played in six AFL seasons.
43 players played in seven AFL seasons.
40 players played in eight AFL seasons
26 players played in nine AFL seasons.
17 players played in all ten AFL seasons: George Blanda, Billy Cannon, Gino Cappelletti, Larry Grantham, Wayne Hawkins, Jim Hunt, Harry Jacobs, Jacky Lee, Paul Maguire, Bill Mathis, Don Maynard, Ron Mix, Jim Otto, Babe Parilli, Johnny Robinson, Paul Rochester, and Ernie Wright.
 Tom Flores was in the league all ten years, but sat out 1962 with injuries.
 Jack Kemp was in the league all ten years, but sat out 1968 with injuries.
 Paul Lowe was in the league all ten years, but sat out 1962 with injuries.

Team notes
Out of the 1,398 people who played in the AFL, this is how many played for X number of teams

1,099 players played for one AFL team.
239 players played for two AFL teams.
49 players played for three AFL teams.
10 players played for four AFL teams.
1 player played for five AFL teams.

External links
 List of players who played in the American Football League

 
American Football League